Patna Metro is a rapid transit system currently under construction in the city of Patna in Bihar, India. It will be owned and operated by the state-run Patna Metro Rail Corporation. In the first phase, five stations of Patna Metro (between Patliputra Bus Terminal to Malahi Pakdi) will be operational first by March 2025. It is being constructed under a Public Private Partnership mode and is estimated to cost . This cost is excluding land acquisition cost, which is to be borne by the Bihar government. The first phase: the east–west corridor (Danapur cantonment-Mithapur-Khemni Chak) and north–south corridor (Patna Railway Station to New ISBT) will consist of a 23.30 km elevated track and 16.30 km underground track.

In January 2022, L&T secured the order from metro operator Delhi Metro Rail Corporation (DMRC) for the design and construction of the Corridor-2 of Phase-1 of Patna MRTS. L&T classifies this contract worth  as a significant order. The major scope of work for the project comprises six underground metro stations viz, Rajendra Nagar, Moin Ul Haq Stadium, University PMCH, Gandhi Maidan and Akashvani of Corridor-2.

Background
Due to rising traffic and congestion on the roads in Patna, a rapid public transportation system was proposed for Patna to deal with the growing needs of the city's population. In November 2011, Union Urban development minister Kamal Nath said that all cities that have a population in excess of 20 lakh would get a metro corridor. According to 2011 census findings, Patna has a population of a little over 20.4 lakh, which makes it eligible for a metro service. The Bihar urban development department is the nodal agency for Patna Integrated Mass Rapid Transport System (PIMRTS). The Bihar government decided to launch the Patna metro or monorail system by 2015. Metro rail emerged as a more viable option for the city than the monorail for the execution of the proposed Patna Integrated Mass Rapid Transport System (PIMRTS) due to the load factor. The planning commission extended its technical support to the proposed metro project.

On 11 June 2013, the Bihar cabinet approved the proposal to prepare a Detailed Project Report (DPR) for a metro train service in Patna. Rail India Technical and Economic Service (RITES) was selected for the purpose, and sanctioned 2.52 crore as a consultancy fee to RITES. On 18 June 2013, the Government of Bihar signed a MoU with the consulting firm—RITES—for a feasibility study and detailed project report preparation for the Patna Metro railway project. Under the agreement, RITES would be required to submit the feasibility report by the first week of December 2013 and the DPR by February 2014. In the scope of its work, the consulting firm is required to identify the mass transit corridors on the basis of a detailed traffi-demand-assessment study, topographic survey, soil survey at 500-meter intervals on the proposed stretch, among other measures. The entire project is expected to be built and operated on a Public Private Partnership model. The cost of Phase 1 is estimated to be 13,411.24 crore.

On 17 June 2014, the planned Patna Metro project received the green light. The Patna Metro Train Corporation was set to be created before 15 August 2014. A detailed report for the project, now planned to proceed in four stages, was due on 31 October 2014. The project received the central government's approval on 6 February 2019 and prime minister Narendra Modi laid the foundation stone on 17 February. In November 2019, DMRC unveiled changes in the project's Detailed Project Report (DPR) and the alignment of both lines. The changes led to the creation of a second interchange at Khemni Chowk, the elimination of Line-1's depot at Aitwarpur, and also the addition of two new stations at Ramkrishna Nagar and Jaganpura.

An agreement has been signed between Patna Metro and JICA (Japan International Cooperation Agency) for a loan of  5520.93 crore. Both the corridors together have 24 metro stations, Patna station and Khemnichak interchange station. In July 2021, PMRC organized a competition to design the logo of Patna Metro, inviting the public to take part, with prizes on offer for the best submissions.

Network

Corridor 1

Corridor 2

Phase 3
 Route 3: Mithapur Chowk - Lohia Nagar - Kankarbagh - Income Tax Colony - Zero Mile - Choti Pahari - Ranipur - Ranipur Chak - Check Post - Guru Ka Bagh - Didarganj

Phase 4
 Route 4 : Bypass Chowk - Vishal - Dasratha - Setu Nagar - Chitkohra - Patna Secretariat - Anishabad - Haroon Nagar (Khoja Imli) - Patna Airport - Phulwari Sharif - Hadaspura - Nosha - AIIMS Patna - Kurji

Construction

Corridor 1

YFC Projects won the contract to build the 8 km elevated section on Corridor 1. The first elevated section will stretch 4 km from Danapur Cantonment station to Patliputra ramp and comprise 4 stations. IAS Colony station was later renamed to Patliputra. The second elevated section will be another 4 km, between Mithapur ramp and Khemni Chak station. Khemni Chak station will be an interchange of the Patna Junction Railway Station and the New ISBT Line 2. The 8 km underground section of Line 1, which will stretch from Rukanpura station to Patna Junction station, has not been awarded yet. KEC International will be the company in charge of the entire network's electrification. All cabling and substation work will also be carried out by the same company.

Corridor 2
NCC Limited and IB Infrastructure have started piling and pier work for the 6.107 section of Corridor 2. Within this section, a total of five elevated stations will be built between Malahi Pakri and New ISBT. The rest of the 7.94 km section for Corridor 2 will be underground, with a ramp to be constructed before the Rajendra Nagar station. A total of seven stations will be underground for Corridor 2, with an underground interchange to be built at the Patna Junction station. The total length of Corridor 2 will be 14.05 km, with a total of twelve stations. For the 8 km underground section of Corridor 2, Larsen & Toubro won the bid to build the TBM bored twin tunnels, the ramp at Rajendra Nagar, and six underground stations. The underground construction for Corridor 2 is expected to cost ₹1,958 crore ($26.25 million and will be completed in three-and-a-half years. This was the last civil package to be awarded for Line 2 after package one for the elevated section of Line 2.

Depot 
There will be only one depot for the entire Patna Metro, to be built at SH-1, Bairiya Chak in Sampatchak at Paijawa, near the Pataliputra Bus Terminal. Both Corridor 1 and 2's depot will be the same. The depot facilities for Danapur-Mithapur-Khemni Chak of the Corridor I and Patna railway station-New ISBT of the Corridor II are proposed to be constructed near SH-1, Bairiya Chak in Sampatchak, Paijawa. the depot will have two workshop bays and three inspection bays, eight stabling bays, which can accommodate 32 three-coach trains, and auto-coach washing plan. The administrative area will consist of an auditorium, training school, canteen and operational control centre. Besides, an auxiliary sub-station of 2500 KVA capacity has been planned for catering to the power supply requirement of the depot. The work is likely to be completed by 2027. The estimated cost to build the depot is ₹143 crore ($19.17 million). Government of Bihar has acquired 76 acres (30.5 ha) at Bairiya Chak.  Out of this land, 47.4 acre (19.2 ha) is proposed for metro rail depot while the remaining areas is for property development.

Land acquisition has also started for the depot and will be completed within a few months. KEC International has also won the bid to install the standard-gauge ballasted tracks inside the depot. The construction contract of the New ISBT depot was awarded to Quality Buildcon in December 2020.

Road connection to Fatuha casting yard
An earth road is being built to ease material transport between Fatuha casting yard (NCC Limited Casting Yard) and metro ISBT depot. Following road construction, batching plant at the casting yard will start functioning.

Future phases
In the second phase, metro rail services will be provided between Bypass Chowk Mithapur to Deedarganj via Transport Nagar, along NH 30 Bypass ; it will be elevated along Bypass Road. The third phase, between Bypass Chowk Mithapur to Phulwari Shariff AIIMS via Anisabad along NH 30 Bypass , will be elevated along Bypass Road. The fourth phase is from Didargang to Fatuha junction.

Status updates
 Sep 2011: On 14 September, the Planning Commission of India gave approval for the Patna Metro project.
 May 2015: A Detailed Project Report (DPR) was to be prepared by May 2015.
 Feb 2016: The Bihar cabinet approved the DPR for Patna Metro prepared by RITES, with a budget of ₹16,960 crores and planned to be executed under a PPP Model by 2021. 
 May 2016: The Patna Metro Rail project got a fresh boost when union urban development minister M. Venkaiah Naidu reportedly assured the government of Bihar of the in-principle approval of the project within a month.
 Jul 2018: Bihar Chief Secretary Deepak Kumar approved the proposed Patna Metro Rail's revised DPR, with a revised estimated cost of  19,500 crore, including land acquisition costs on 3 July.
 Sep 2018: The Bihar cabinet approved the constitution of "Patna Metro Rail Corporation Ltd (PMRCL)" as a Special-Purpose Vehicle (SPV) for the implementation of Patna Metro on 25 September.
 Sep 2018: The Public Finance Committee approved the DPR of the Patna Metro Rail Project on 28 September.
 Oct 2018: The Bihar cabinet approved the DPR on 9 October, after which it is to be sent to the central government for approval.
 Nov 2018: The Central Government approved the DPR for Patna Metro on 20 November.
 Feb 2019: Patna Metro received approval from the Public Investment Board (PIB) on 6 February. The Union Cabinet approved the Patna Metro Rail Project comprising 2 corridors on 13 February.
 Feb 2019: Prime Minister Narendra Modi laid the foundation stone for Patna's first metro rail corridor on 17 February 2019. Patna Metro Rail Corporation incorporated on 18 February.
 Mar 2019: Patna Metro Rail Corporation Limited formally opened its office at Indira Bhawan in Patna on 4 March.
 Jul 2019: Patna Metro work set to start in 3 months.
 Aug 2019: Drone survey started on 23 August and is slated to end on 15 October.
 Sep 2019: DMRC to oversee project execution. Work to begin by the end of 2019. 
 Feb 2020: AECOM bags consultancy contract for both corridors for the Patna Metro Project.
 Jul 2020: Quality Buildcon Pvt Ltd. emerges as the lowest bidder for constructing the New ISBT Depot on Line 2
 Aug 2020: NCC Limited emerges as the lowest bidder on 31 August 2020 for the first 6.1 km of the route's construction (Malahi Pakri to New ISBT of Line 2)
 Nov 2020: Physical construction of Patna Metro's Phase 1 officially begins on 26 November.
 Apr 2021: Pier work begins on Patna Metro's  6.1 km "Malahi Pakri—New ISBT" section on 28 April.
 Jul 2021: YFC Projects emerges as the lowest bidder to build the roughly 8 km elevated package of Patna Metro's Line-1 (Danapur Cantonment to Patliputra and Mithapur to Jaganpura).
 Jul 2021: Larsen & Toubro (L&T) emerges as the lowest bidder to construct the only underground section of Patna Metro's Line-2 (Akashvani to Rajendra Nagar) on 19 July.
Oct 2021: Process to acquire land begins in for ISBT Metro Station and Depot in Ranipur and Pahadi areas.
August 2022: Chief Minister Nitish Kumar inaugurated the underground metro rail work it at Moin-ul-Haq Stadium by unveiling the stone plaque of the underground work of Patna Metro Rail Project. The civil work on underground metro station at Moin-ul-Haq Stadium  started with the construction of the diaphragm wall (D-wall), the main support structure to demarcate the station premises. Around 82-foot-long D-wall, a concrete structure, was inserted in the dug-up ground with similar depth.

See also
 Urban rail transit in India
 Kanpur Metro
 Gorakhpur Metro

References

External links

 Patna Metro on Facebook

Proposed rapid transit in India
Transport in Patna
Standard gauge railways in India
2024 in rail transport

 Unofficial Patna Metro Rail Page : The Under-develop Patna metro rail site(Unofficial).